Ceroplesis aethiopica is a species of beetle in the family Cerambycidae. It was described by Breuning in 1974. It is known from Ethiopia.

References

Endemic fauna of Ethiopia
aethiopica
Beetles described in 1974